List of international rugby football teams may refer to:

 List of international rugby union teams
 List of International Rugby League members